I, Gemini is the debut album by British pop duo Let's Eat Grandma, released 17 June 2016 via Transgressive Records.

Reception

Year-end lists

Track listing

Personnel 
 Jenny Louise Hollingworth – vocals, saxophone, keyboards, recorder, mandolin, drums, synthesizer, cello, triangle, percussion, glockenspiel
 Rosa Jewel Walton – vocals, keyboards, synthesizer, glockenspiel, drums, bass guitar, harmonica, mandolin, chimes, electric guitar, percussion, piano, ukulele
 Will Twynham – producer, mixing engineer
 Mary Epworth – production assistant
 Guy Davie – mastering engineer
 Tim Webster – mixing engineer

References 

2016 debut albums
Let's Eat Grandma albums
Transgressive Records albums
Pop albums by English artists